The Oceania Table Tennis Federation (OTTF) is a table tennis organization founded on 1 June 1977, recognized by International Table Tennis Federation (ITTF) as its continental federation in Oceania.
Discussions began at the Commonwealth Table Tennis Championships held in Melbourne, 1975. Seven foundation members were New Zealand, Australia, Guam, Papua New Guinea, Fiji, New Caledonia and Tahiti.

Members
There are 24 affiliated member associations.
 - American Samoa Table Tennis Association
 - Table Tennis Australia
 - Cook Islands Table Tennis Association
 - Federated States of Micronesia Table Tennis Association
 - Fiji Table Tennis Association
 - Guam Table Tennis Association
 - Kiribati Table Tennis Association
 - Marshall Islands Table Tennis Association
 - Nauru Table Tennis Association
 - Ligue Caledonienne de Tennis de Table
 - Table Tennis New Zealand
 - Niue Table Tennis Association
 - Norfolk Island Table Tennis Association
 - Marianas Table Tennis Association
 - Palau Table Tennis Association
 - Papua & New Guinea Table Tennis Association
 - Samoa Table Tennis Association
 - Solomon Islands Table Tennis Association
 - Federation Tahitienne de Tennis de Table
 - Tokelau Table Tennis Association
 - Tonga Amateur Table Tennis Association
 - Tuvalu Table Tennis Association
 - Vanuatu Table Tennis Federation
 - Wallis & Futuna Table Tennis Association

Competitions
Competitions held by OTTF:
 Oceania Championships
 Oceania Cup
 Pacific Cup
Oceania Cadet Challenge
Competitions held by other organizations:
Pacific Games

References

External links
Official website of the OTTF

Table tennis organizations
T
Sports organizations established in 1977
Table tennis in Oceania